Virgil Hodge (born 17 November 1983) is a female sprinter from Saint Kitts and Nevis who specializes in the 200 metres. She was born in Basseterre.

At the 2008 Summer Olympics in Beijing she competed at the 100 metres sprint. In her first round heat she placed fourth behind Muna Lee, Anita Pistone and Guzel Khubbieva, normally causing elimination. However her time of 11.48 was among the ten fastest losing times, which was enough to advance to the second round. There she failed to qualify for the semi finals as her time of 11.45 was the fourth time of her heat.

She is a graduate of Texas Christian University where she was a top performer on the track and field team.

Achievements

Personal bests
100 metres - 11.29 s (2007) - national record.
200 metres - 22.68 s (2007) - national record.

References

1983 births
Living people
People from Basseterre
Saint Kitts and Nevis female sprinters
Olympic athletes of Saint Kitts and Nevis
Athletes (track and field) at the 2008 Summer Olympics
Athletes (track and field) at the 2003 Pan American Games
Athletes (track and field) at the 2007 Pan American Games
Pan American Games competitors for Saint Kitts and Nevis
Central American and Caribbean Games medalists in athletics
Olympic female sprinters